Mohammed Sheliah Al-Jahani (born 28 September 1974) is a retired Saudi Arabian footballer.

Club career
At the club level, he played most of his career for Al Ahli.

International career
Al-Jahani also played for the Saudi Arabia national football team, and was a participant in the 1998 FIFA World Cup, 2002 FIFA World Cup, 1997 FIFA Confederations Cup and 1999 FIFA Confederations Cup.

He also participated in the 1996 Summer Olympics and the 1993 FIFA World Youth Championship.

See also
 List of men's footballers with 100 or more international caps

References

External links

1974 births
Saudi Arabian footballers
Saudi Arabia international footballers
1996 AFC Asian Cup players
1997 FIFA Confederations Cup players
1998 FIFA World Cup players
1999 FIFA Confederations Cup players
2002 FIFA World Cup players
AFC Asian Cup-winning players
Living people
Footballers at the 1996 Summer Olympics
Olympic footballers of Saudi Arabia
Al-Ahli Saudi FC players
FIFA Century Club
Association football defenders
Saudi Professional League players
Footballers at the 1994 Asian Games
Asian Games competitors for Saudi Arabia
20th-century Saudi Arabian people
21st-century Saudi Arabian people